Robert Bourassa Boulevard, formerly named University Street (excluding a small section), is a major north-south artery in downtown Montreal, Quebec, Canada that is  in total length.

Robert Bourassa Boulevard runs  from the foot of the Bonadventure Expressway (and the start of Quebec Autoroute 10) to where it intersects with Sherbrooke Street. A small  portion of the road retains the name University Street, and runs from McGill University to the former Royal Victoria Hospital complex, where the road ends.

Geography
The street ends in the south where the Bonaventure Expressway's northern terminus, which is also the western terminus of the Eastern Townships Expressway (A10). It also runs south into two streets that are parallel to the expressway on its eastern sides: Duke Street on the east side and Nazareth Street on the west side of the elevated highway. The street ends in the north at the former Royal Victoria Hospital parking lot, which separates its main campus from the Montreal Neurological Institute and McGill University's Molson Stadium, below Mount Royal Park.

Robert Bourassa Boulevard

Robert Bourassa links major cross-streets Sherbrooke Street, de Maisonneuve Boulevard, Sainte-Catherine Street, Rene Levesque Boulevard, Notre Dame Street.

There are several notable buildings located on the southern portion of the street, which include Place Ville Marie, Place Bonaventure, Telus Tower and the world headquarters of ICAO.

At its southern end, the street forms the western boundary of the Montreal International Quarter, with a colonnade of pillars encasing a stylized representation of the flags of the world.

University Street

University links major cross-streets Sherbrooke Street, Pine Avenue.

There are several notable buildings located on the southern portion of the street, these include McGill University, the High School of Montreal (now serving as the schoolgrounds for F.A.C.E. School) and the original Royal Victoria Hospital (relocated in 2015; now sits empty and disused).

Origins
University Street was named and inaugurated on November 30, 1842. The major part of the street links Dorchester (later renamed René Lévesque Boulevard) and Sherbrooke Street and was ceded by the descendants of Sir Thomas Phillips, a merchant, and a construction entrepreneur who became a city councillor in the 1840s. University then ended at Sherbrooke Street, where a little path continued to McGill University from which the street got its name. It was eventually extended from Sherbrooke Street to just past Pine Avenue, where it reaches the base of Mount Royal and goes along the former Royal Victoria Hospital.

McGill University has many buildings on the street.

On March 15, 2015, following a decision to rename the street, University Street was shortened to a three-blocks section between Sherbrooke Street and Pine Avenue and now ends slightly beyond at the base of Mount Royal.

Partial name change
On August 27, 2014, Montreal Mayor Denis Coderre announced that the part of University Street through Downtown Montreal would be renamed Robert Bourassa Boulevard, after former Quebec Premier Robert Bourassa. The portion of the street stretches from Notre Dame to Sherbrooke Street. Only a small section of the street, between McGill University and the former Royal Victoria Hospital, would retain its original name. The official change took place on March 15, 2015.

Controversy 
The name change has not been without controversy. Some city officials have raised complaints that the change is political in nature and does not reflect the importance of McGill University in the development of the area.

References

Streets in Montreal
Downtown Montreal
Boulevards